The 6th season of Jak oni śpiewają, the Polish edition of Soapstar Superstar, started on March 7, 2009 and ended on May 23, 2009. It was broadcast by Polsat. Joanna Liszowska and Krzysztof Ibisz continued as the hosts, and the judges were: Edyta Górniak, Elżbieta Zapendowska and Rudi Schuberth.

Stars

Scores

Red numbers indicate the lowest score for each week.
Green numbers indicate the highest score for each week.
 indicates the star eliminated that week.
 indicates the returning stars that finished in the bottom two.
 indicates the star who has got immunitet

Best Score (6.0)

Average Chart 
{| class="wikitable" style="font-size:100%; text-align:center"
!Place
!Star
!Average
!Best Score
!Worst Score
!Total
!Number of songs
|---
|-bgcolor="gold"
|align="center"|1.
|align="center"|Laura Samojłowicz
|align="center"|5.70
|align="center"|6.0
|align="center"|4.8
|align="center"|96.8
|align="center"|17
|---
|-bgcolor="silver"
|align="center"|2.
|align="center"|Bożena Dykiel
|align="center"|5.59
|align="center"|6.0
|align="center"|4.8
|align="center"|55.9
|align="center"|10
|---
|-bgcolor="#cc9966"
|align="center"|3.
|align="center"|Krzysztof Hanke
|align="center"|5.50
|align="center"|6.0
|align="center"|3.8
|align="center"|71.4
|align="center"|13
|---
|align="center"|4.
|align="center"|Robert Kudelski
|align="center"|5.53
|align="center"|6.0
|align="center"|4.3
|align="center"|88.6
|align="center"|16
|---
|align="center"|5.
|align="center"|Maciej Jachowski
|align="center"|5.54
|align="center"|6.0
|align="center"|4.3
|align="center"|94.1
|align="center"|17
|---
|align="center"|6.
|align="center"|Aleksandra Zienkiewicz
|align="center"|5.40
|align="center"|6.0
|align="center"|4.1
|align="center"|81
|align="center"|15
|---
|align="center"|7.
|align="center"|Katarzyna Żak
|align="center"|5.34
|align="center"|5.6
|align="center"|5.1
|align="center"|16
|align="center"|3
|---
|align="center"|8.
|align="center"|Jacek Borkowski
|align="center"|5.27
|align="center"|6.0
|align="center"|3.8
|align="center"|42.1
|align="center"|8
|---
|align="center"|9.
|align="center"|Maria Niklińska
|align="center"|5.11
|align="center"|5.8
|align="center"|4.3
|align="center"|40.9
|align="center"|8
|---
|align="center"|10.
|align="center"|Andrzej Deskur
|align="center"|5.10
|align="center"|5.1
|align="center"|5.1
|align="center"|5.1
|align="center"|1
|---
|align="center"|11.
|align="center"|Samuel Palmer
|align="center"|5.02
|align="center"|6.0
|align="center"|4.0
|align="center"|30.1
|align="center"|6
|---
|align="center"|12.
|align="center"|Daniel Wieleba
|align="center"|4.78
|align="center"|5.8
|align="center"|3.3
|align="center"|19.1
|align="center"|4
|---
|align="center"|13.
|align="center"|Aleksandra Nieśpielak
|align="center"|4.72
|align="center"|5.3
|align="center"|3.8
|align="center"|23.6
|align="center"|5
|---
|align="center"|14.
|align="center"|Marcin Kwaśny
|align="center"|4.65
|align="center"|5.5
|align="center"|3.8
|align="center"|9.3
|align="center"|2
|---
|-bgcolor='Khaki'
|align="center" colspan=2|Everystar'|align="center"|5.48
|align="center"|6.0
|align="center"|3.3
|align="center"|674
|align="center"|123
|}

Guest Performances

Episodes

Week 1Individual judges scores in charts below (given in parentheses) are listed in this order from left to right: Edyta Górniak, Elżbieta Zapendowska, Rudi Schuberth, Katarzyna Cichopek.Running order

Week 2Individual judges scores in charts below (given in parentheses) are listed in this order from left to right: Edyta Górniak, Elżbieta Zapendowska, Rudi Schuberth, Marcin Miller.Running order

Week 3Individual judges scores in charts below (given in parentheses) are listed in this order from left to right: Edyta Górniak, Elżbieta Zapendowska, Rudi Schuberth, Andrzej Piaseczny.Running order

Week 4Individual judges scores in charts below (given in parentheses) are listed in this order from left to right: Edyta Górniak, Elżbieta Zapendowska, Rudi Schuberth, Jan Borysewicz.Running order

Week 5Individual judges scores in charts below (given in parentheses) are listed in this order from left to right: Edyta Górniak, Elżbieta Zapendowska, Rudi Schuberth, Mariusz Pudzianowski.Running order

Week 6Individual judges scores in charts below (given in parentheses) are listed in this order from left to right: Edyta Górniak, Elżbieta Zapendowska, Rudi Schuberth, Justyna Steczkowska.Running order

Week 7Individual judges scores in charts below (given in parentheses) are listed in this order from left to right: Edyta Górniak, Elżbieta Zapendowska, Rudi Schuberth, Marek Starybrat.Running order

Week 8Individual judges scores in charts below (given in parentheses) are listed in this order from left to right: Edyta Górniak, Elżbieta Zapendowska, Rudi Schuberth, Łukasz Zagrobelny.Running order

Week 9Individual judges scores in charts below (given in parentheses) are listed in this order from left to right: Edyta Górniak, Elżbieta Zapendowska, Rudi Schuberth, Ryszard Rynkowski.Running order

Week 10Individual judges scores in charts below (given in parentheses) are listed in this order from left to right: Edyta Górniak, Elżbieta Zapendowska, Rudi Schuberth, Łukasz Golec.Running order

Week 11Individual judges scores in charts below (given in parentheses) are listed in this order from left to right: Edyta Górniak, Elżbieta Zapendowska, Rudi Schuberth, Damian Aleksander.Running orderIndividual judges scores in charts below (given in parentheses) are listed in this order from left to right: Edyta Górniak, Elżbieta Zapendowska, Rudi Schuberth, Beata Kozidrak.Running order

Week 12Individual judges scores in charts below (given in parentheses) are listed in this order from left to right: Edyta Górniak, Elżbieta Zapendowska, Rudi Schuberth.''

Running order

Another Songs

Song Chart

 Not scored
 Highest scoring dance
 Lowest scoring dance

Rating Figures

5
2009 Polish television seasons